The Sierra Mixe or Mixes District is a district in the east of the Sierra Norte Region of the Mexican state of Oaxaca. It comprises 17 municipalities and covers 4,930 km2 at an average elevation of 1,200 meters above sea level. 
As of 2005 the district had a total population of 96,920.
The main food crops are maize and beans, while permanent crops include coffee, lemon and oranges.

Most of the inhabitants are of indigenous Mixe ethnicity, and the Mixe languages are spoken throughout the region. The western part of the region is high Sierra, with climate ranging to temperate to cold with strong winds and seasons of daily and constant rains and storms, this changes to the Mixe media territories; of lower mountain ranges but still a very abrupt and rough terrain, with daily rain, ranging from tropical to mist forests to pine-encine, but the more eastern parts are the tropical lowlands of the Isthmus of Tehuantepec.

Municipalities

The district includes the following municipalities:

References

Districts of Oaxaca
Sierra Norte de Oaxaca
Sierra Madre de Oaxaca
Geography of Oaxaca